is an above-ground railway station on the Tokyo Metro Tozai Line in the city of Ichikawa, Chiba, Japan, operated by the Tokyo subway operator Tokyo Metro. Its station number is T-19.

Lines

Station layout
This station consists of two elevated side platforms.

Platforms

History
The station was opened by Teito Rapid Transit Authority on 27 March 1981.

The station facilities were inherited by Tokyo Metro after the privatization of the Teito Rapid Transit Authority (TRTA) in 2004.

Passenger statistics
In fiscal 2019, the station was used by an average of 53,769 passengers daily (boarding passengers only).

Bus routes
Tokyo Bay City Bus
For Shin-Urayasu Station and Maihama Station
Keisei Bus
For Mizue Station, Edogawa Sport Land 
For Shin-Urayasu Station 
Ichikawa City Community Bus
For Chiba Museum of Science and Industry Media Park Ichikawa via Myoden Station and Gyotoku Station
For Tokyo Bay Medical Center

See also
 List of railway stations in Japan

References

External links

Tokyo Metro station information

Railway stations in Chiba Prefecture
Railway stations in Japan opened in 1981
Stations of Tokyo Metro
Tokyo Metro Tozai Line
Ichikawa, Chiba